Lev Kreft (born 15 September 1951) is a Slovenian politician, former Member of Parliament, editor, philosopher and sociologist.

Biography 
He was elected into the first Parliament of the Republic of Slovenia in 1992 and acted as Vice President of Parliament during that term.

He has lectured at the following institutions:
 Faculty of Philosophy in Ljubljana
 Faculty of Biotechnology in Ljubljana
 Academy of Music in Ljubljana
 Faculty of Arts in Ljubljana
 Teachers' Academy in Ljubljana.

He co-founded the Forum 21 movement in 2004.

His father was the Slovene playwright Bratko Kreft.

References

External links 
 FF.uni-lj.si bio
 FF.uni-lj.si bio2

1951 births
Jewish socialists
Living people
Slovenian Jews
Slovenian sociologists
Politicians from Ljubljana
Jewish philosophers
20th-century Slovenian philosophers
Postmodernists
Slovenian Marxists
Political philosophers
Academic staff of the University of Ljubljana
21st-century Slovenian philosophers